Truls or Troels is a Nordic masculine given name. Truls is mainly used in Norway, and to a lesser extent in Sweden. Troels is predominantly used in Denmark.
It is a short form of Torgils, derived from  Old Norse Þórgísl (Old Danish Thrugils, Thrugels, Old Swedish Thorgils, Thorgisl), composed of Þór-, the name of the god of thunder, and gísl "arrow, arrow-shaft".

Troels
Troels Frederik Lund (1840–1921), Danish historian
Troels Wörsel (born 1950), Danish painter
Troels Kirk (born 1956), Danish painter
Troels Rasmussen (born 1961), Danish football (soccer) player
Troels Rusel (born 1964), Danish darts player
Troels Bech (born 1966), Danish football player, then manager
Troels Lyby (born 1966), Danish film, television and stage actor
Troels Svane (born 1967), Danish cellist and part of the Zapolski Quartet
Troels Brun Folmann (born 1974), musical composer specialized in orchestral music featured in TV shows, trailers and video games
Troels Lund Poulsen (born 1976), Danish politician and government minister
Lars Troels Jørgensen (born 1978), Danish handball player
Troels Nielsen or Troo.L.S (born 1982), Danish musician and music producer
Troels Vinther (born 1987), Danish road bicycle racer
Troels Gustavsen (born 1988), Danish singer/songwriter, part of the Danish duo Noah
Troels Harry (born 1990), Danish curler

Truls
Truls Fyhn (1945–2011), Norwegian police chief
Truls Glesne (1916–1971), Norwegian economist and civil servant
Truls Heggero, Norwegian singer
Truls Johannessen Wiel Graff (1851–1918), Norwegian county governor
Truls Korsæth (born 1993), Norwegian cyclist
Truls Kristiansen (born 1964), Norwegian ice hockey player
Truls Mørk (born 1961), Norwegian cellist
Truls Ove Karlsen (born 1975), Norwegian alpine skier
Truls Wickholm (born 1978), Norwegian politician and member of parliament

See also

Trulsen (surname)

Norwegian masculine given names